Knowsley is a civil parish in the Metropolitan Borough of Knowsley, Merseyside, England.  It contains seven buildings that are recorded in the National Heritage List for England as designated listed buildings.   Of these, two are listed at Grade II*, the middle of the three grades, and the others are at Grade II, the lowest grade.  The parish is dominated by Knowsley Hall, which is listed.  The other listed buildings are a church, a former vicarage, a farmhouse, a lodge, a war memorial, and a school later converted into cottages.

Key

Buildings

References

Citations

Sources

Listed buildings in Merseyside
Lists of listed buildings in Merseyside